Hesar (also Romanized as Ḩeşār and Zanjānrūd) is a village in Chaypareh-ye Pain Rural District, Zanjanrud District, Zanjan County, Zanjan Province, Iran. At the 2006 census, its population was 731, in 193 families.

References 

Populated places in Zanjan County